Yaganovo is a rural locality (a selo) and the administrative center of Yaganovskoye Rural Settlement, Cherepovetsky District, Vologda Oblast, Russia. The population was 823 as of 2002. There are 11 streets.

Geography 
Yaganovo is located 33 km northeast of Cherepovets (the district's administrative centre) by road. Nazarovskaya is the nearest rural locality. etimologia

References 

Rural localities in Cherepovetsky District